La Romana is the professional male volleyball team representing La Romana Province.

History
The team was founded in 2007.

Current squad
As of December 2008

 Coach:  Loren Ricardo
 Assistant coach:  Rene Beli

References

External links
League official website

2007 establishments in the Dominican Republic
Dominican Republic volleyball clubs
Volleyball clubs established in 2007